Billy Connolly's World Tour of New Zealand is the fourth, and currently last, of Billy Connolly's decade-spanning 'world tours' that follow the comedian on his various travels across the globe. In this tour, filmed in 2004, Connolly visited New Zealand and travelled 8,500 km throughout the country, from Stewart Island in the south, through South Island and North Island, to Ninety Mile Beach in the north. As he did on his 1996 tour of Australia, Connolly travelled on a custom-made Yamaha XV1700 Warrior trike that had been built by the Trike Shop in the United Kingdom. The trike is now in the hands of a new owner in Melbourne, Australia.

The series was made up of eight episodes in which Connolly gave insights into the history and culture of the country, especially its Māori heritage, while also giving highlights from the New Zealand leg of his Too Old to Die Young tour. The leather jacket he often wore sports a skull with glasses, the logo of the tour.

Continuing his catalogue of nude endeavours, he bungee jumped from the Nevis High Wire in Queenstown.

The soundtrack, Billy Connolly's Musical Tour of New Zealand, contained a track by folk singer Kate Rusby.

External links 
 

2004 British television series debuts
2004 British television series endings
Scottish television shows
BBC television documentaries
Comedy tours
Billy Connolly
Television shows set in New Zealand
English-language television shows